National Route 51 is a national highway of Japan connecting Chūō-ku, Chiba and Mito, Ibaraki.

Route data
Length: 124 km (77.05 mi).

History

References

051
Roads in Chiba Prefecture
Roads in Ibaraki Prefecture